In architecture and landscape architecture, a sunken courtyard, sometimes called a sunken plaza, is a courtyard below ground level.

Gallery

References 

 

Courtyards